The second USS Intrepid, was a steam-powered torpedo ram commissioned and built in 1874 that had the distinction of being the world's first U.S. Navy ship armed with self-propelled torpedoes.  In concept and design she was roughly comparable to the Royal Navy's , although Intrepid was completed more than half a decade earlier. The Intrepid was commissioned by President Ulysses S. Grant's Secretary of Navy George M. Robeson.

Construction
Intrepid, like the other torpedo rams, was a product of the confusion that followed the invention of the self-propelled torpedo, which saw the world's navies struggle to find a way to effectively utilize the earliest torpedo designs.  Her keel was laid down at the Boston Navy Yard and she was launched on 5 March 1874, sponsored by Miss H. Evelyn Frothingham Pooke.  After construction completed, Intrepid was commissioned into the U.S. Navy on 31 July.  Her commanding officer was Commander Augustus P. Cooke.

Service
As with most of the earliest torpedo-armed warships, Intrepid was a largely experimental vessel of little true value as an actual fighting ship.  After her commissioning ceremony, she departed Boston on 3 August for the naval base at Newport, Rhode Island.  Since she was a new and untried design, Intrepid remained in coastal waters for the majority of the voyage, and arrived in Newport the next day.  After a little less than a month at Newport she was transferred to New York.  Leaving on 31 August, she arrived at the New York Navy Yard on 1 September.  The following two months were devoted to torpedo trials along the North Atlantic Coast, which showed that Intrepid's design was generally unsatisfactory.  Her final trial cruise ended when she returned to New York Navy Yard on 24 October, and she was decommissioned a week later on 30 October.

Intrepid remained out of service at New York for the remainder of 1874 and the first half of 1875 before being recommissioned on 28 August.  Even though she would remain in commission for the remainder of the decade, with the exception of brief visits to New England ports in 1875 and 1876, she remained at the Navy Yard.

Despite her unsatisfactory and experimental nature, the financially starved Navy Department looked for ways to utilize her to some good purpose, since money and congressional support for new warships was almost non-existent during this period.  The Navy eventually decided to convert Intrepid to a light-draft gunboat for service in Chinese waters.  As a result, she was decommissioned on 22 August 1882 and moved to the shipyard at the New York Navy Yard for conversion.  The work proceeded slowly and was suspended altogether in 1889.  Years of inactivity had taken their toll on the ship, and a survey undertaken in early 1892 found that she had become unserviceable.  Since the funding needed to restore Intrepid would be far more than could be possibly be justified by her future value as a gunboat, it was decided to dispose of her.  Intrepid was stricken from the Navy List, and on 9 May 1892 she was sold to a certain Mathew Gill, Jr., of Philadelphia.  She was probably broken up soon afterwards.

References 

Rams of the United States Navy
Torpedo boats of the United States Navy
Ships built in Hingham, Massachusetts
1874 ships